Bookjam creates e-publishing platforms for publishers by making ebook market apps. It also provides a cloud system for users to read their purchased contents on all devices.

History 
After creating his first start up, Interqubit, Cho was surprised to find out that most publishers were not able to afford to make ebooks, even at a low price. Therefore, he offered a revenue sharing model and began to make their books at no cost. After the very first ebook he made reached second-place ranking in Apple app store Korea, he changed his company name to 'Bookjam' in 2011, and began expanding.

As of October 2013, Bookjam has raised $17 million venture capital funding from Altos Ventures and Bon Angles.

In February 2014, Bookjam announced that it had entered the Japanese ebook market, by cooperating with Leed.

In February 2014, Bookjam announced its plan to provide cloud service to readers in May, which will allow contents to be synced across all platforms on all devices.

BXP 
BXP stand for Bookjam eXtensible Publication, and is a platform created by Bookjam in 2011. BXP allows the production of interactive multimedia ebooks and optimized layouts for all devices with more features than what ePub allows. It can also add Vimeo videos, embed maps, offer social media, and enable audio recording. BXP allows auto compression of images to enable fast download that is adjusted to the resolution of the device.

Business and Services 
Bookjam aims to provide multifunctional ebooks to readers and provide direct to consumer platform for publishers.

Awards 
Innovation Award by Korea Electronic Publishing Association

2013 Korea eBooks Awards, Winner, "The Land"

2013 Korea eBooks Awards, Encouragement Award, "The Master Chef"

References 

Electronic publishing